The United States competed at the 2013 World Games held in Cali, Colombia.

Medalists

Air sports 

Two medals were won in air sports.

Archery 

Three golds medals and one silver medal were won in archery.

Reo Wilde and Erika Jones respectively won the gold medal in the men's compound and women's compound events. They also won the gold medal in the mixed team compound event. Brady Ellison won the silver medal in the men's recurve event.

Karate 

Cheryl Murphy won the bronze medal in the women's kumite 68 kg event.

Racquetball

References 

Nations at the 2013 World Games
2013 in American sports
2013